Adoxophyes horographa is a species of moth of the family Tortricidae. It is found on the Bismarck Archipelago in the western Pacific Ocean.

References

Moths described in 1928
Adoxophyes
Moths of Oceania